Bernard Derosier (born 10 November 1939 in Chevilly, Loiret) is a French politician.  He was a long term member of the National Assembly of France, representing the Nord department from 1978 to 2012, as a member of the Socialist Party.

He represented Nord's 4th constituency
from 1978 to 1986, then the whole department during the one term of proportional representation
(1986-1988), then Nord's 2nd constituency from 1988 to 2012.

References

1939 births
Living people
Socialist Party (France) politicians
Deputies of the 12th National Assembly of the French Fifth Republic
Deputies of the 13th National Assembly of the French Fifth Republic
Chevaliers of the Légion d'honneur
Politicians from Hauts-de-France